MCCD may refer to:
 Medical Certificate of Cause of Death
 Marin Community College District in California
 Maricopa Community College District in Arizona
 Georgia Motor Carrier Compliance Division, a division of the Georgia Department of Public Safety
 Joint Cyber-Defence Command, the cyber defence service of the Spanish Defence Staff